The 2013 Robert Morris Colonials football team represented Robert Morris University in the 2013 NCAA Division I FCS football season. They were led by 20th-year head coach Joe Walton and played their home games at Joe Walton Stadium. They were a member of the Northeast Conference. They finished the season 5–6, 3–3 in NEC play to finish in a three way tie for third place. Head coach Joe Walton retired at the end of the season.

Schedule

Source: Schedule

References

Robert Morris
Robert Morris Colonials football seasons
Robert Morris Colonials football